The Elijah Parish Lovejoy Prize for Courage in Journalism was an award presented annually by the International Conference of Weekly Newspaper Editors (ICWNE) and Southern Illinois University. The award was presented to weekly newspaper editors. Named after Elijah Parish Lovejoy, the award was established in 1956.

Purpose

History 
The International Society of Weekly Newspaper Editors (or ISWNE) moved from Southern Illinois to Northern Illinois in 1975. The University of Southern Illinois notified ISWNE that the Lovejoy Award was the property of the university, rather than the organization. Thereafter, the award was not issued, although the award for journalists is still issued by Colby College.

Recipients

References

External links
University of Southern Illinois

Colby College
American journalism awards
Awards established in 1952
Elijah Parish Lovejoy Award recipients
Editor awards (print)